Ibrolipim (NO-1886) is a cholesterol lowering drug from the statin family, which acts as a lipoprotein lipase activator. The discovery of the "statin" mevalonic acid synthesis inhibitors focused new attention on control of blood lipid levels as a measure to stave off heart disease. A number of compounds have been found that treat elevated lipid levels by other diverse mechanisms. The phosphonic acid derivative ibrolipim is believed to lower those levels by accelerating fatty acid oxidation.

References

Statins
Bromoarenes
Nitriles
Benzanilides
Phosphonate esters
Ethyl esters